Água Doce is a municipality in the state of Santa Catarina in the South region of Brazil. The Morro do Capão Doce is situated in its territory.

See also
List of municipalities in Santa Catarina

References

Municipalities in Santa Catarina (state)